Peter Thomas Wall (born 13 September 1944) is an English retired professional footballer who played in England and the United States as a full back. He subsequently became a coach in the United States.

Career

Playing career
Wall was born on 13 September 1944 in Shrewsbury. After leaving education at Pontesbury Secondary Modern School,
he signed a professional contract with Shrewsbury Town in 1963, making 18 league appearances during the next two seasons. He signed for Wrexham in 1965, and made 22 league appearances over the next two seasons. Wall moved to Liverpool in 1967, and over the next three seasons made 31 league appearances. Wall then signed for Crystal Palace, where he made 177 league appearances over seven seasons. While at Crystal Palace, Wall spent the 1972–73 season on loan with Leyton Orient. Wall later played in the NASL for the St. Louis Stars and the California Surf.

Coaching career
Following his retirement as a player following the end of the 1980 season, Wall became manager of the California Surf for the 1981 season, and the Los Angeles Lazers between 1982 and 1987.

References

External links

Wall at holmesdale.net

1944 births
Living people
Sportspeople from Shrewsbury
English footballers
Shrewsbury Town F.C. players
Wrexham A.F.C. players
Liverpool F.C. players
Crystal Palace F.C. players
Leyton Orient F.C. players
California Surf players
St. Louis Stars (soccer) players
North American Soccer League (1968–1984) indoor players
North American Soccer League (1968–1984) players
Association football fullbacks
English football managers
North American Soccer League (1968–1984) coaches
English expatriate sportspeople in the United States
Expatriate soccer players in the United States
Expatriate soccer managers in the United States
English expatriate footballers
English expatriate football managers